Khari Ahmad Long (born May 23, 1982) is a former professional American and Canadian football defensive end. He was drafted by the Kansas City Chiefs in the sixth round of the 2005 NFL Draft. Long was also a member of the Chicago Bears, Dallas Cowboys, Buffalo Bills, Hamilton Tiger-Cats, and Calgary Stampeders. He played college football at Baylor.

Early years
Long attended Rider High School in Wichita Falls, Texas, lettering in football and basketball. As a junior, he registered 122 tackles and 7 sacks. He was limited in his senior season with a sprained ankle.

College career
Long accepted a football scholarship from Baylor University. As a junior, he appeared in 11 games (4 starts) at defensive end and defensive tackle, registering 41 tackles, 4.5 sacks, 3 quarterback pressures and one pass defensed. As a senior, he appeared in 10 games (8 starts) at left defensive end, posting 31 tackles, 1.5 sacks, 3 quarterback pressures and one pass defensed.

He played in 39 college games (22 starts), finishing with 145 tackles, 19.5 tackles for loss, 9 sacks, two forced fumbles, four passes defensed and 14 quarterback pressures.

Professional career
Long was selected by the Kansas City Chiefs in the sixth round (199th overall) of the 2005 NFL Draft. He was limited with a back injury but still made the team. On November 24, he was released and signed to the practice squad.

On January 10, 2006, he was signed by the Chicago Bears to the practice squad. On August 21, he was placed on the injured reserve list with an injured shoulder. He was released on April 19, 2007.

On August 3, 2007, he was signed as a free agent by the Dallas Cowboys. On September 1, he was released and signed to the practice squad 2 days later. He was released on December 18.

On December 20, 2007, he was signed by the Buffalo Bills to their practice squad.

On January 16, 2008, he was re-signed by the Dallas Cowboys. He was released on July 28.

Omaha Nighthawks
Long signed with the Omaha Nighthawks on August 25, 2011.

References

External links
Just Sports Stats
Baylor Bears bio

1982 births
Living people
People from Wichita Falls, Texas
Players of American football from Texas
American football defensive ends
American football linebackers
American players of Canadian football
Canadian football defensive linemen
Baylor Bears football players
Kansas City Chiefs players
Chicago Bears players
Dallas Cowboys players
Buffalo Bills players
Hamilton Tiger-Cats players
Omaha Nighthawks players